Mario Iván Flores Hernández (born 28 February 1979 in Ciudad de México, Distrito Federal) is a Mexican race walker.

Achievements

References

1979 births
Living people
Mexican male long-distance runners
Mexican male racewalkers
Athletes (track and field) at the 2004 Summer Olympics
Athletes (track and field) at the 2008 Summer Olympics
Olympic athletes of Mexico
Athletes from Mexico City
20th-century Mexican people
21st-century Mexican people